The Master of Public Health or Master of Philosophy in Public Health (MPH), Master of Science in Public Health (MSPH), Master of Medical Science in Public Health (MMSPH) and the Doctor of Public Health (DrPH), International Masters for Health Leadership (IMHL) are interdisciplinary professional degrees awarded for studies in areas related to public health. The MPH degree focuses on public health practice, as opposed to research or teaching. Master of Public Health programs are available throughout the world in Schools of Public Health, Programs in Public Health, Medical Schools, and Schools of Public Affairs. MPH degrees, in addition to including a core curriculum, will usually also let students pursue a specialization in a specific field, such as epidemiology, biostatistics, or health management.

General
A professional degree is one that, based on its learning objectives and types of positions its graduates pursue, prepares students with a broad mastery of the subject matter and methods necessary in a field of practice; it typically requires students to develop the capacity to organize, analyze, interpret and communicate knowledge in an applied manner.

Master's degrees
In some countries the MPH program is only available for physician graduates (MBBS, MD, DO, or equivalent). In those countries, individuals without a medical degree may enter a Master of Science in Public Health (MSPH) or Master of Medical Science in Public Health (MMSPH) programs.

Core disciplines 
The traditional MPH degree is designed to expose candidates to five core discipline areas of public health:
Biostatistics
Epidemiology
Environmental Health
Health Policy and Health Administration
Social and behavioral sciences

Doctorate degrees
The Doctor of Public Health (DrPH) degree is for those who intend to pursue or advance a professional practice career in public health and for leaders and future leaders in public health practice. They face the particular challenge of understanding and adapting scientific knowledge in order to achieve health gain and results. This degree leads to a career in high-level administration, teaching, or practice, where advanced analytical and conceptual capabilities are required. The usual requirement for entry into this program is a master's degree in Public Health (MPH). The DrPH program develops in its candidates all competencies included in MPH programs, with increased emphasis on high-level skills in problem-solving and the application of public health concepts.

India
In India, the MPH degree course is a two-year postgraduate course or a postgraduate diploma of one year (DPH), approved by the Medical Council of India, which is open to candidates with a bachelor's degree in any discipline from a recognized university, with at least 50% marks. But preference is given to applicants having a bachelor's degree in any of the health-related fields - Medical, dental, pharmacy, physiotherapy, nursing, AYUSH and paramedical sciences; veterinary sciences and from the management; natural sciences (including biology); social sciences and social work; statistics; engineering; law; commerce or accounting, communication etc. In some institutions, preference will be given to MBBS doctors. Relevant work experience in health or development sector will be an advantage but not mandatory. In India, job opportunities for MPH graduates with a medical degree are generally good, but for others (non-medical MPH graduates) it is not clear.

Malaysia
In Malaysia, the first MPH programme started in 1973 by the Department of Social and Preventive Medicine, University of Malaya. It was in response to an acute need of the Ministry of Health Malaysia for Medical Offices of Health to serve in the then fast expanding rural health services. The first batch of specialist graduated in 1974. Thus the programme during the first decade of its existence was aimed at producing competent public health specialist to serve the rural areas.

Currently, universities in Malaysia that offer the master programme in public health are the University of Malaya, Universiti Kebangsaan Malaysia, Universiti Sains Malaysia, Universiti Putra Malaysia, Universiti Malaysia Sarawak (UniMAS), Universiti Malaysia Sabah (UMS), Universiti Teknologi Mara (UiTM), Universiti Kuala Lumpur, Perdana University, International Medical University, RCSI & UCD Malaysia Campus (formerly known as Penang University), University of Cyberjaya, MAHSA University, Lincoln University, and Monash University Malaysia.

The programmes include Master of Public Health, Master of Medical Science in Public Health, Global Public Health, and Master of Science in Public Health (Global Health). The duration of the programmes is between 1 and 1.5 years full-time, and for part-time students, the duration will be longer. The entry requirement for the Master programme in Public Health in Malaysia is a medical, dental or pharmacy undergraduate degree, or any other science degree, and with the relevant working experience.

The Doctor of Public Health (DrPH) degree programme is the highest professional degree for individuals focusing on Public Health practice. It is intended for leaders and future leaders in public health who want a flexible career which combines high-level leadership, management and research. Their career pursuits may include applied research, teaching and/or practice in the field of health services and public health administration. In Malaysia, the DrPH programme is available from the University of Malaya, Universiti Kebangsaan Malaysia, Universiti Sains Malaysia, Universiti Putra Malaysia, Universiti Malaysia Sarawak (UniMAS), Universiti Malaysia Sabah (UMS), and Universiti Teknologi Mara (UiTM).

Public health medicine specialist
The public health medicine specialists are medical specialists in the field of public health registered with the Malaysian National Specialist Registry (NSR). The prerequisites for registration is the process of a medical degree who is registered with the Malaysian Medical Council, a Master of Public Health degree, and either a Doctor of Public Health degree or a Doctor of Philosophy degree from a medical or public health school, and with six months to one-year postgraduation working experience in Public Health.

United Kingdom
In the United Kingdom, the MPH or MSc in Public Health is usually a one-year full-time program. Taught modules typically account for two-thirds of the MPH and a project one third. Students may be medical or non-medical graduates. Degrees vary in their content, but most cover similar areas of public health. Because of the key role played by public health practitioners in the NHS a UK MPH also often includes health economics.

Degrees that include a substantial epidemiological component are more selective and some require applicants to demonstrate ability before applying, by the completion of an online test MPH Selection Test.

Faculty of Public Health (UK)

In the UK specialist accreditation in public health is provided by the Faculty of Public Health (FPH). Specialist accreditation is through participation in a four-year program analogous to specialist training for doctors. Specialist trainees must pass two sets of examinations, demonstrably achieve certain skills and submit a portfolio of work. However specialist training in public health is now also open to non-doctors. The Faculty of Public Health is an autonomous joint faculty of the three Royal Colleges of Physicians of the United Kingdom (London, Glasgow and Edinburgh) and awards Diplomate Membership and full Membership by examination and Fellowship to those who have gained admission to the relevant professional register such as the register held by the General Medical Council.

United States 
In the United States, any person with an accredited undergraduate degree may pursue an MPH or MSPH and usually takes two-years of full-time work to complete. Based on the accreditation of the Council on Education for Public Health (CEPH), an MPH or MSPH is not a clinical degree. However, some states in the United States recognize MPH holders as ancillary clinical professionals (and patient-facing clinical staff) especially with regard to preventive medicine, health education, and other functions in the clinical and hospital environments. In fact, most hospital systems have MPH public health staff to study disease trends and help to combat hospital-acquired infections (nosocomial infections) and immediately determine epidemiologic trends, for example, flu outbreak tendencies, etc.

The Association of Schools of Public Health represents schools of public health that are accredited by the Council on Education for Public Health (CEPH). Delta Omega is the honor society for graduate studies in public health. The society was founded in 1924 at the Johns Hopkins School of Hygiene and Public Health. Currently, there are approximately 68 chapters throughout the United States and Puerto Rico.

Council on Education for Public Health 
In the United States the Council on Education for Public Health (CEPH) accredits schools of public health and programs of public health through a formal review process.

Certified in Public Health (CPH) Exam 
CPH is the only public health board certification available in the United States for public health professionals. In 2008, the National Board of Public Health Examiners (NBPHE), a United States-based credentialing board, began offering the certification exam (CPH) designed to test mastery of the core competencies of the public health professionals.

Recertification requirements
After candidates pass the Continuing Education for CPH examination, they must maintain the certification with 50 CPH recertification credits approved by the NBPHE.

The NBPHE's Board of Directors primarily represents five key collaborating organizations: the American Public Health Association, the Association of Prevention Teaching and Research, the Association of Schools of Public Health, the Association of State and Territorial Health Officials, and the National Association of County and City Health Officials. The board is dedicated to increasing recognition of the public health profession, raising the visibility of public health, and measuring and improving the competency of public health workers across the nation and around the world.

Council of Graduate Programs in Public Health 
The Council of Graduate Programs in Public Health represents the accredited and emerging graduate programs across the United States that grant public health degrees and therefore prepare students for professional careers in public health. The Council encourages, promotes and supports universities, schools and colleges in developing, maintaining, and advancing graduate programs in the disciplines of preventive medicine, social medicine, community health and public health. The council is sponsored by the Association for Prevention Teaching and Research.

Specialization

The MPH degree in India is covers all major disciplines of public health including Environment and Health, Gender issues, Public Health Nutrition, Sexual and Reproductive Health but some institutes offer specialization such as Social epidemiology, Health Policy, Health and Development, Health System Management, Economics or Finance.

Subjects

Topics covered during the course include 
Social Epidemiology including Chronic and Infectious disease Epidemiology,
Biostatistics,
Environmental and Occupational Health, Gender Issues in Health, 
Health Policy Analysis and Health Administration, 
Social and behavioral sciences,
Health System Management, Sexual and Reproductive Health, Health and Development, 
Health Economics, Public Health Nutrition,
National Health Programs, Medical Anthropology, Research Methodology,
Public health Ethics and Law.

References

External links
 Council of Graduate Programs in Public Health
 Society for Public Health Education
 Association of Schools and Programs of Public Health
 Council on Education for Public Health
 List of CEPH accredited Schools & Programs of Public Health
 National Board of Public Health Examiners
 The Association of Schools of Public Health in the European Region

Public Health